Jeziorno may refer to the following places:
Jeziorno, Greater Poland Voivodeship (west-central Poland)
Jeziorno, Kuyavian-Pomeranian Voivodeship (north-central Poland)
Jeziorno, Masovian Voivodeship (east-central Poland)
Jeziorno, Pomeranian Voivodeship (north Poland)
Jeziorno, Człuchów County in Pomeranian Voivodeship (north Poland)
Jeziorno, Warmian-Masurian Voivodeship (north Poland)